Memphis: Direct from Broadway is a 2011 film of the original Broadway production of the musical Memphis as captured live in performance on Broadway. The show was captured at Broadway's Shubert Theatre in New York City January 18–21, 2011, utilizing multiple high-definition cameras and 96 tracks of sound recording. The film had a limited theatrical release between April 28-May 3, 2011, in more than 530 theaters with high-definition digital projection systems in the US and Canada. This marked the first time the Tony Award-winning Best Musical was presented in movie theaters while concurrently running on Broadway.

Shout! Factory announced that it had partnered with Broadway Worldwide to bring the 131-minute film to home audiences. Memphis debuted for streaming on Netflix in July 2011. The film was released nationwide on Blu-ray, DVD and digital download on January 24, 2012. Prior to its January 2012 in-store release, the DVD and Blu-ray edition became available October 14, 2011, at the Broadway home of Memphis, the Shubert Theatre, as well as venues presenting the national tour of the musical, which launched the same day at the Orpheum Theatre in Memphis, Tennessee. NCM Fathom distributed the movie in US locations, while Fremantle Media has the rights for international distribution.

The film is assembled from footage shot at five regularly scheduled performances January 18–21, 2011, at the Shubert Theatre. The film includes a 20-minute behind-the-scenes look at how the show was captured for the big screen, followed directly into the feature presentation of the complete Broadway musical.

Cast
 Chad Kimball as Huey 
 Montego Glover as Felicia
 J. Bernard Calloway as Delray
 Derrick Baskin as Gator
 James Monroe Iglehart as Bobby
 Michael McGrath as Mr. Simmons
 Cass Morgan as Mama
 Jennifer Allen as Clara/White Mother/Ensemble
 Brad Bass as Perry Como/Frank Dryer/Ensemble
 Tracee Beazer as 'Someday' Backup Singer/Ensemble
 Tanya Birl as Ethel/Ensemble
 Kevin Covert as Buck Wiley/Martin Holton/Ensemble
 Preston W. Dugger III as Be Black Trio/Ensemble
 Hillary Elk as Teenager/Ensemble
 Bryan Fenkhart as Ensemble
 Dionne Figgins as 'Someday' Backup Singer/Double Dutch Girl/Ensemble
 Bahiyah Sayyed Gaines as Ensemble
 Rhett George as Black DJ/Be Black Trio/Ensemble
 Todrick Hall as Ensemble
 Robert Hartwell as Wailin' Joe/Reverend Hobson/Ensemble
 John Jellison as White DJ/Mr. Collins/Gordon Grant/White Father/Ensemble
 Brian Langlitz as Ensemble
 Kyle Leland as Be Black Trio/Ensemble
 Paul McGill as Ensemble
 Andy Mills as Ensemble
 Betsy Struxness as Double Dutch Girl/Ensemble
 Dan'yelle Williamson as 'Someday' Backup Singer/Ensemble

References

External links
  
 

American musical films
Films about music and musicians
Rock musicals
2010s English-language films
2010s American films